James Vacca is an American politician who served in the New York City Council from the 13th district from 2006 to 2017. He is a Democrat.

The district includes Allerton, Baychester, Bronx Park, City Island, Country Club, Ferry Point Park, Hart Island, Morris Park, Pelham Bay, Pelham Bay Park, Pelham Islands, Schuylerville, Throggs Neck, part of Van Nest and Westchester Square in The Bronx.

Early life and education
Vacca was born in The Bronx and raised in Pelham Bay. He attended New York City public schools, graduating from P.S. 71, J.H.S. 101, and Christopher Columbus High School in the Bronx. He holds a Bachelor of Arts degree in political science from Empire State College and a Master of Arts in Urban Studies from Queens College, City University of New York.

Career 
Since 2003 Vacca has served as an adjunct professor at CUNY Queens College, where he teaches a variety of courses in the social sciences. He was appointed as distinguished lecturer in the Urban Studies Department in 2018. In addition, Vacca serves as an executive member of the Academic Senate at Queens College. He recently founded the college's food pantry to address the needs impacting the school's students. Continuing his work from his days in the New York City Council as chairperson of technology, he is a member of the Queens College Tech Incubator Advisory Board.

Prior to being elected to the city council in 2005, Vacca served as district manager of Bronx Community Board 10 for 26 years, and was appointed to the position in 1980, when he was 25 years old, becoming one of the youngest district managers in the city's history. He had previously served as chairman of the board. For numerous consecutive years under his leadership, Board 10 was ranked the cleanest and safest community board in the Bronx.

New York City Council
In early 2005, with Councilwoman Madeline Provenzano term-limited out of office, Vacca announced his candidacy for the 13th Council District seat. Already an established public figure in the East Bronx due to his years as district manager, he was endorsed by Congressman Joseph Crowley and Assemblyman Michael Benedetto, as well as dozens of community and civic groups, and The New York Times.

In the September 13, 2005, Democratic Party primary, he faced four opponents: former Assemblyman Stephen B. Kaufman, Joseph A. McManus, Ismael Betancourt, and Egidio Joseph Sementelli. He won with nearly 40% of the vote; Kaufman captured roughly 25%. In the general election, he defeated Philip Foglia, candidate of the Republican, Conservative and Independence Party lines, with 64% of the vote.

In 2009, facing a little-known challenger running on the Conservative Party line, Vacca was easily re-elected to a second term, winning 92.8% of the vote. He easily won election to a final term in 2013 with over 83% of the vote.

On Council, Vacca was an advocate for responsible zoning laws and for prevention of overdevelopment. In 2007, Vacca was also named co-chair of the council's Working Group on School Governance and Mayoral Control, established to guide the council recommendations upon the expiration of mayoral control in 2009. After months of informal meetings with educators, union leaders, Administration officials, advocates, and parents, the Working Group issued its report in June 2009. The report suggested a new system of municipal control. Later that month, the New York State legislature passed 8903-A, a bill relating to the management and operation of the New York City School District.

Vacca has also been influential in protecting funding for the Fire Department of New York. He also has been a proponent of congestion pricing.

In August 2017, as chair of the Committee on Technology, Vacca introduced an algorithmic transparency bill, Int. 1696-2017, that would require city agencies "that use algorithms or other automated processing methods that target services, impose penalties, or police persons to publish the source code used for such processing"—a nationwide first. The bill was influenced by the scholarship of Danah boyd, Kate Crawford, and Cathy O'Neil. After public hearings and negotiation with city agencies, an amended bill, Int. 1696-A, passed the City Council unanimously in December 2017. The amended bill creates a task force to consider the issue and report to the city in late 2019. Researcher Julia Powles, assessing the amended bill in The New Yorker, predicted that the task force's findings will have significant international and domestic impact, but warned that the bill's lack of reporting requirements for city agencies means the task force will need to rely on agencies' voluntary disclosures, which may be sparse.

Personal life 
Vacca came out as gay in 2016.

Election history

See also
 LGBT culture in New York City
 List of LGBT people from New York City

References

External links
 Official website

Living people
New York City Council members
Queens College, City University of New York alumni
New York (state) Democrats
1955 births
Gay politicians
American LGBT city council members
LGBT people from New York (state)
21st-century American politicians
Politicians from the Bronx